Netcher Road Bridge is a covered bridge spanning water in Jefferson Township, Ashtabula County, Ohio, United States. The bridge, one of the newest and one of currently 17 drivable covered bridges in the county, is a single span constructed of timber arches with inverted Haupt walls, in a "Neo-Victorian" design.  It was built in 1998, and it was funded by an ODOT Timber Grant.  The bridge’s WGCB number is 35-04-63, and it is located approximately 2.0 mi (3.2 km) east of Jefferson.

History
1998 – Bridge constructed.

Dimensions
Length: 110 feet (33.5 m)
Width: 22 feet (6.7 m)

Gallery

See also
List of Ashtabula County covered bridges

References

External links
Ohio Covered Bridges List
Ohio Covered Bridge Homepage
The Covered Bridge Numbering System
Ohio Historic Bridge Association
Netcher Road Covered Bridge from Ohio Covered Bridges, Historic Bridges

Covered bridges in Ashtabula County, Ohio
Bridges completed in 1998
Road bridges in Ohio
Wooden bridges in Ohio